Bernard Cullen or Bernie Cullen may refer to:

Bernard Cullen (born 1950), Irish philosophy professor, submitter with Richard Kearney at the New Ireland Forum
Bernard Cullen, American politician; see List of members of Boston City Council
Bernard Cullen, American educator, Director General of the Marquette League (1937–1957)

See also
Cullen (disambiguation)